The 2013 K League Challenge was the first season of the K League Challenge, the second top South Korean professional league for association football clubs, since its establishment in 2013. The 2013 fixtures were announced on 30 January 2013. The season began on 16 March.

Promotion and relegation
Teams relegated from 2012 K-League
 Gwangju FC
 Sangju Sangmu Phoenix

Teams
A total of eight teams contested the league, including two sides from the 2012 K-League and six promoted from the Korea National League, Challengers League and R-League.

Stadiums and Locations

1: Police FC withdraw the right to play at home ground. Police FC play all matches as away matches.

Personnel and kits

Note: Flags indicate national team as has been defined under FIFA eligibility rules. Players may hold more than one non-FIFA nationality.

Foreign players
Restricting the number of foreign players strictly to four per team, including a slot for a player from AFC countries. A team could use four foreign players on the field each game including a least one player from the AFC country.

League table

Promotion-Relegation Playoffs

1st Leg

2nd Leg

''Sangju Sangmu secure promotion to the 2014 K League Classic season, 4–2 on aggregate.

Season statistics

Top scorers

Top assists

Attendance

Awards
The 2013 K League Awards was held on 3 December 2013.

K League Challenge Most Valuable Player

The K League Challenge Most Valuable Player award was won by  Lee Keun-Ho (Sangju Sangmu)

K League Challenge of the Year

The K League Manager of the Year award was won by  Park Hang-Seo (Sangju Sangmu)

K League Challenge Top Scorer

The K League Top Scorer award was won by  Lee Keun-Ho (Sangju Sangmu)

K League Challenge Top Assistor

The K League Top Assistor award was won by  Yeom Ki-Hun (Korean Police)

K League Challenge Best XI

References

 2013 Season Review at K League Website

External links
Official K League Website 

K League Challenge seasons
K
K
K